John Wayne Troxell (born  1964) is a retired United States Army senior non-commissioned officer who served as the third Senior Enlisted Advisor to the Chairman of the Joint Chiefs of Staff (SEAC). This position made him the most senior enlisted member of the United States Armed Forces. He enlisted in the United States Army in September 1982, as an armored reconnaissance specialist and graduated from One Station Unit Training at Fort Knox, Kentucky.

Army career
Troxell served in the United States Army for over 37 years in numerous units throughout his career. They included the 3rd Armored Cavalry Regiment in Fort Bliss, Texas; 2 tours in Germany with the 3rd Armored Division, and the 3rd Infantry Division; 3 tours in the 82nd Airborne Division at Fort Bragg, North Carolina; Campbell University Reserve Officers' Training Corps in Buies Creek, North Carolina, and the Special Operation Division of Joint Task Force Six (Counterdrug) in El Paso, Texas. He has served as the command sergeant major of the 3rd Squadron, 17th Cavalry Regiment, 10th Mountain Division, Fort Drum, New York and in Iraq; the regimental command sergeant major of the 2nd Stryker Cavalry Regiment in both Fort Polk, Louisiana and Fort Lewis, Washington; the command sergeant major of the 4th Stryker Brigade Combat Team, 2d Infantry Division, Fort Lewis, Washington and in Iraq; the 21st command sergeant major of the U.S. Army Armor Center and Fort Knox, Kentucky; the command sergeant major of the U.S. Army Accessions Command and Human Resource Center of Excellence at Fort Knox, Kentucky, the command sergeant major of I Corps at Joint Base Lewis-McChord, Washington, the command sergeant major of the International Security Assistance Force Joint Command in Afghanistan and the Command Senior Enlisted Leader of United Nations Command/Combined Forces Command/United States Forces Korea. His official date of retirement was on March 31, 2020.

Troxell's five combat tours of duty included making the combat parachute jump and service in Operation Just Cause in Panama, Operation Desert Shield/Storm, two tours in Operation Iraqi Freedom, and Operation Enduring Freedom in Afghanistan. His military education includes Ranger, Airborne, Jumpmaster, Pathfinder, PLDC, BNCOC, ANCOC, and the First Sergeant Course. He is a graduate of Class 51 of the U.S. Army Sergeants Major Course and the Command Sergeants Major Course. Troxell is also a graduate of the National Defense University Keystone Joint Command Senior Enlisted Leader Course, the United States Army War College Strategic Leader Development Course and the Army Strategic Leader Development Course (Intermediate) at the University of North Carolina at Chapel Hill. Troxell's civilian education includes a Master's degree in Business Administration from TUI University in California. He is a Centurion of the Order of Saint Maurice (National Infantry Association).

Suspension
Troxell was re-assigned from Senior Enlisted Advisor to Special Assistant to the Vice Director of the Joint Staff, from September 2018 to March 2019, pending the outcome of an investigation of misconduct. An Army Inspector General investigation determined Troxell was guilty of “the improper use of U.S. military personnel to conduct tasks not associated with their official duties, such as personal errands, and improper endorsement of commercial fitness and nutrition products on official SEAC social media platforms." The investigation found there was no personal or monetary gain from these endorsements. Troxell was administratively disciplined for breaching ethics rules and re-instated.

Awards and decorations

CSM Troxell is a Centurion of the Order of Saint Maurice (National Infantry Association).

References

Year of birth missing (living people)
Living people
United States Army personnel of the Iraq War
Recipients of the Defense Superior Service Medal
Recipients of the Legion of Merit
United States Army personnel of the War in Afghanistan (2001–2021)